Gale is an unincorporated community in Alexander County, Illinois, United States. Gale is located along the Mississippi River north of Thebes. The community is served by Illinois Route 3.

References

Unincorporated communities in Alexander County, Illinois
Unincorporated communities in Illinois
Cape Girardeau–Jackson metropolitan area